Zbyněk Šidák (24 October 1933 – 12 November 1999) was a Czech mathematician. He is known for developing the Šidák correction.

Early life and education
Šidák was born and raised in Golčův Jeníkov. He completed his undergraduate studies in statistics at Charles University in Prague in 1956, received a Ph.D. in 1961, and a DrSc. in 1973.

Career
Beginning in 1956, and continuing until his death, Šidák was a researcher in the mathematical department of the Czechoslovak Academy of Sciences and spent several years as head of the Department of Probability Theory and Mathematical Statistics.

During his life, Šidák held posts as a visiting faculty member at the University of Stockholm, University of North Carolina, Moscow State University, Michigan State University, and others.  He also served as chief editor of the scholarly journal Applications of Mathematics.

The Šidák correction, a method used to counteract the problem of multiple comparisons, was credited to a 1967 paper by Šidák.

Personal life
In 1958 Šidák married Krista Štěpničková. They had two sons and a daughter.

References

Czech statisticians
1933 births
1999 deaths
Charles University alumni
People from Havlíčkův Brod District